Per Olov Bengtsson (born May 31, 1967) is a former ice speed skater from Sweden. He represented his native country in three consecutive Winter Olympics: 1988 in Calgary, Canada, 1992 in Albertville, and 1994 in Lillehammer.

References

External links
 

1967 births
Living people
Swedish male speed skaters
Speed skaters at the 1988 Winter Olympics
Speed skaters at the 1992 Winter Olympics
Speed skaters at the 1994 Winter Olympics
Olympic speed skaters of Sweden
Place of birth missing (living people)
20th-century Swedish people